Ildikó Jónás (born 19 February 1941) is a Hungarian sprinter. She competed in the women's 4 × 100 metres relay at the 1960 Summer Olympics.

References

1941 births
Living people
Athletes (track and field) at the 1960 Summer Olympics
Hungarian female sprinters
Olympic athletes of Hungary
Place of birth missing (living people)
Olympic female sprinters
Universiade medalists in athletics (track and field)
Universiade bronze medalists for Hungary